Michael Ray "Louie" Meadows (born April 29, 1961) is a retired American Major League Baseball left fielder.

He attended North Carolina State University, where he played baseball for the Wolfpack.  Drafted by the Houston Astros in the 2nd round (43rd overall pick) of the 1982 MLB amateur draft, Meadows made his Major League Baseball debut with the Houston Astros on July 3, 1986. He signed with the Philadelphia Phillies as a free agent on July 4, 1990, and appeared in his final game on October 3, 1990. He had 127 career at bats in 102 games. He had a .173 lifetime batting average. He batted and threw left-handed.

References

1961 births
Living people
Baseball players from North Carolina
Major League Baseball outfielders
Houston Astros players
Philadelphia Phillies players
Daytona Beach Astros players
NC State Wolfpack baseball players
People from Jones County, North Carolina